Dutchtown is an unincorporated community of Ascension Parish, Louisiana, United States. 

Dutchtown High School

Unincorporated communities in Ascension Parish, Louisiana
Baton Rouge metropolitan area
Unincorporated communities in Louisiana